Vanilla is an unincorporated community in Franklin County, in the U.S. state of Pennsylvania.

History
A post office called Vanilla was in operation from 1902 until 1905.

References

Unincorporated communities in Franklin County, Pennsylvania
Unincorporated communities in Pennsylvania